Ludwig Baumann (11 May 1853 – 6 February 1936) was an Austrian architect.

Life
Baumann was born in Seibersdorf Castle in Troppau, Austrian Silesia, and grew up in a middle-class environment, which enabled him eventually to study at the ETH-Zurich. He came from a family of constructive expertise, as his father was a civil engineer. After completing his architectural studies (1870–74), he was employed by  beginning in 1876, and then by Viktor Rumpelmayer from 1879 to 1882. In 1882 he formed a partnership with Emil Bressler. Beginning in 1888 he served as a highly valued architect to the upper-middle class and aristocracy of the Austro-Hungarian monarchy. In particular, he enjoyed the favor and trust of Archduke Franz Ferdinand. In 1904 with Hermann Helmer he founded the Central Association of Architects.

Initially influenced by the international Renaissance revival due to his studies in Zurich with Gottfried Semper, around 1900 Baumann switched to a conservative Baroque-revival vocabulary as an Austrian "imperial style". In 1907 he was appointed site manager of the New Hofburg, replacing Friedrich Ohmann. Between 1909 and 1913, his Austro-Hungarian War Ministry was erected as the last monumental building on the Ringstrasse. Baumann was also selected to design many buildings in the Lower Austrian city of Berndorf when it was significantly expanded under Arthur Krupp.

In 1929, still active in various planning projects, Baumann was hit by a bus near the Rochuskirche in Vienna. The injuries sustained could not heal properly, and Baumann spent his last three years in a wheelchair before dying in Vienna.

Selected works
 Berndorf in Lower Austria, urban planning (from 1880s)
 School, Berndorf (1896)
 Apartment house at Malinovského náměstí 5, Brno, Czech Republic (1896)
 Villa Pazelt, Bad Vöslau (1897)
 Austrian Pavilion, Exposition Universelle, Paris (1900)
 Vienna Ice Skating Club Square (1900)
 Royal Academy of Oriental Languages, Vienna, today the Embassy of the United States (1902)
 Ministry of War, Vienna (1908-1910)
 Hofburg, new building of the ballroom wing, Vienna (from 1910)
 Wiener Konzerthaus and Akademietheater, Vienna (together with Büro Fellner & Helmer, 1911–1913)
 Palazzetto Venezia, Rome (reconstruction 1909–1910)

Bibliography
  [Building description of the Olympion]. Vienna: Verlag des Eislauf-Vereins, 1877.
 Ludwig Baumann, Emil Bressler, Friedrich Ohmann:  [Baroque: A Collection of Ceilings, Cartouches, Consoles, Grilles, Furniture, Vases, Stoves, Ornaments, Interiors, etc., Mostly in Imperial Palaces, Churches, Monasteries and other Monumental Buildings in Austria from the Period of Leopold I to Maria Theresa]. Vienna: Schroll, 1886.
  [Explanatory report on the drafts of a general regulation plan for the entire municipal area of Vienna]. Vienna: Friedrich Jasper, 1893.
  [Explanatory report on the drafts of a general regulation plan for the entire municipal area of Vienna]. Vienna: Schroll, 1894.
  [Explanations of the concurrence project for the use of the rotunda at the exhibition planned in 1898]. Vienna: Friedrich Jasper, 1896.
  [The Chamber of Commerce for Lower Austria in Vienna]. In: . vol. 14 (1908), pp. 12–14, OBV . - Text online. ( ANNO ).
  [My Resume and My Job]. Vienna: Rosenbaum, 1931.

References

1853 births
1936 deaths
19th-century Austrian architects
20th-century Austrian architects
People from Opava
ETH Zurich alumni